This is a list of the fungus species in the genus Ascochyta.  Many are plant pathogens.  Ascochyta is an  anamorph for many species placed in Didymella (the teleomorph) but both names refer to the same organism.   there are 1,184 species included.  There is also one subgenus: Ascochyta subgen. Ascochyta Lib..

A

 Ascochyta abelmoschi 
 Ascochyta abramovii 
 Ascochyta abroniae 
 Ascochyta abutilonicola 
 Ascochyta abutilonis 
 Ascochyta acericola 
 Ascochyta acerina 
 Ascochyta aceris 
 Ascochyta achlydis 
 Ascochyta achlyicola 
 Ascochyta aconitana 
 Ascochyta aconiti 
 Ascochyta acori 
 Ascochyta actaeae 
 Ascochyta actinidiae 
 Ascochyta aculeorum 
 Ascochyta adenocaulonis 
 Ascochyta adenophorae 
 Ascochyta adenostylis 
 Ascochyta adzamethica 
 Ascochyta aegilopis 
 Ascochyta aegopodii 
 Ascochyta aeridesae 
 Ascochyta aerospora 
 Ascochyta aesculi 
 Ascochyta affinis 
 Ascochyta agerati 
 Ascochyta aggregata 
 Ascochyta agrimoniae 
 Ascochyta agropyri-repentis 
 Ascochyta agropyrina 
 Ascochyta agrostidis 
 Ascochyta agrostis 
 Ascochyta ahmadii 
 Ascochyta ailanthi 
 Ascochyta ajugae 
 Ascochyta akebiae 
 Ascochyta akselae 
 Ascochyta alaskensis 
 Ascochyta albomaculata 
 Ascochyta alceina 
 Ascochyta aleuritidis 
 Ascochyta aleuritis 
 Ascochyta alfrediae 
 Ascochyta alhagi 
 Ascochyta alismatias 
 Ascochyta alismatis 
 Ascochyta alkekengi 
 Ascochyta allii-cepae 
 Ascochyta allii 
 Ascochyta alni 
 Ascochyta aloidis 
 Ascochyta alopecuri 
 Ascochyta alpina 
 Ascochyta alstoniae 
 Ascochyta althaeina 
 Ascochyta amaranthi 
 Ascochyta ambrosiana 
 Ascochyta amelanchieris 
 Ascochyta amorphae 
 Ascochyta amorphophallicola 
 Ascochyta ampelina 
 Ascochyta andropogonivora 
 Ascochyta androsaceae 
 Ascochyta androsaces 
 Ascochyta anemones 
 Ascochyta anethicola 
 Ascochyta angelicae 
 Ascochyta angelicarum 
 Ascochyta anisomera 
 Ascochyta annonaceae 
 Ascochyta anonaceae 
 Ascochyta antarctica 
 Ascochyta anthistiriae 
 Ascochyta anthoxanthi 
 Ascochyta antirrhini 
 Ascochyta aphyllanthis 
 Ascochyta apiospora 
 Ascochyta aquatica 
 Ascochyta aquifolii 
 Ascochyta aquilariae 
 Ascochyta aquilegiae 
 Ascochyta arachidis 
 Ascochyta araliae 
 Ascochyta araujae 
 Ascochyta arctica 
 Ascochyta arcuata 
 Ascochyta arenaria 
 Ascochyta argillacea 
 Ascochyta ari 
 Ascochyta aricola 
 Ascochyta arida 
 Ascochyta arigena 
 Ascochyta aristolochiae 
 Ascochyta aristolochicola 
 Ascochyta aristolochiicola 
 Ascochyta armoraciae 
 Ascochyta arnicae 
 Ascochyta aromatica 
 Ascochyta arophila 
 Ascochyta artemisiae 
 Ascochyta arunci 
 Ascochyta arundinariae 
 Ascochyta arundinis 
 Ascochyta asari 
 Ascochyta asclepiadearum 
 Ascochyta asclepiadicola 
 Ascochyta asclepiadis 
 Ascochyta asparagina 
 Ascochyta aspidistrae 
 Ascochyta asteris 
 Ascochyta astragali 
 Ascochyta astragalicola 
 Ascochyta astrantiae 
 Ascochyta atra 
 Ascochyta atraphaxidis 
 Ascochyta atraphaxis 
 Ascochyta atriplicis 
 Ascochyta atropae 
 Ascochyta atropunctata 
 Ascochyta aucubae 
 Ascochyta aucubicola 
 Ascochyta australis 
 Ascochyta avenae 
 Ascochyta axyridis 
 Ascochyta aëridis

B

 Ascochyta babajaniae 
 Ascochyta babylonica 
 Ascochyta baccae 
 Ascochyta baccharidis 
 Ascochyta baccicola 
 Ascochyta bacilligera 
 Ascochyta bacteriiformis 
 Ascochyta balansae 
 Ascochyta ballotina 
 Ascochyta balsamita 
 Ascochyta bambusicola 
 Ascochyta bambusina 
 Ascochyta banosensis 
 Ascochyta baptisiae 
 Ascochyta basellae 
 Ascochyta batatae 
 Ascochyta batatas 
 Ascochyta bataticola 
 Ascochyta bauhiniae 
 Ascochyta baumgartneri 
 Ascochyta begoniae 
 Ascochyta benningiorum 
 Ascochyta berberidina 
 Ascochyta berberidis 
 Ascochyta betae 
 Ascochyta beticola 
 Ascochyta betonicae 
 Ascochyta betonicicola 
 Ascochyta betulae 
 Ascochyta betulina 
 Ascochyta bidentis 
 Ascochyta bieniaszii 
 Ascochyta biforae 
 Ascochyta bignoniae 
 Ascochyta biguttulata 
 Ascochyta boehmeriae 
 Ascochyta boeremae 
 Ascochyta boerhaaviae 
 Ascochyta boerhaviae 
 Ascochyta bohemica 
 Ascochyta boltshauseri 
 Ascochyta bombacacearum 
 Ascochyta bombacina 
 Ascochyta bombycina 
 Ascochyta bondarceviana 
 Ascochyta bondarzewii 
 Ascochyta boni-henrici 
 Ascochyta boopidis 
 Ascochyta boraginis 
 Ascochyta borjomi 
 Ascochyta bornmuelleri 
 Ascochyta boutelouae 
 Ascochyta boydii 
 Ascochyta brachypodii 
 Ascochyta brassicae-campestris 
 Ascochyta brassicae-junceae 
 Ascochyta brassicae-rapae 
 Ascochyta brassicae 
 Ascochyta bresadolae 
 Ascochyta brunnea 
 Ascochyta bryoniae 
 Ascochyta bryophila 
 Ascochyta bubakiana 
 Ascochyta buffoniae 
 Ascochyta bulgarica 
 Ascochyta buniadis 
 Ascochyta bupleuri 
 Ascochyta butleri 
 Ascochyta buxicola 
 Ascochyta buxina

C

 Ascochyta cajophorae 
 Ascochyta cakiles 
 Ascochyta calamagrostidis 
 Ascochyta calami 
 Ascochyta calendulae 
 Ascochyta callistea 
 Ascochyta calpurniae 
 Ascochyta calycanthi 
 Ascochyta calystegiae 
 Ascochyta camelliae 
 Ascochyta campanulae 
 Ascochyta camphorae 
 Ascochyta candelariellicola 
 Ascochyta cannabis 
 Ascochyta cannae 
 Ascochyta capparidis 
 Ascochyta capparis 
 Ascochyta capsici 
 Ascochyta caraganae 
 Ascochyta cardiacae 
 Ascochyta caricae-papayae 
 Ascochyta caricae 
 Ascochyta caricicola 
 Ascochyta caricina 
 Ascochyta caricis-arenariae 
 Ascochyta caricis-hebridensis 
 Ascochyta caricis-ripariae 
 Ascochyta caricis 
 Ascochyta carinthiaca 
 Ascochyta carpathica 
 Ascochyta carpinea 
 Ascochyta carpogena 
 Ascochyta carthagenensis 
 Ascochyta carthami 
 Ascochyta carvi 
 Ascochyta caryae 
 Ascochyta caryoticola 
 Ascochyta caryotina 
 Ascochyta cassandrae 
 Ascochyta cassiae 
 Ascochyta catabrosae 
 Ascochyta catalpae 
 Ascochyta caulicola 
 Ascochyta cauligena 
 Ascochyta caulina 
 Ascochyta caulium 
 Ascochyta celosiae 
 Ascochyta celtidis 
 Ascochyta cenchricola 
 Ascochyta cephalanthi 
 Ascochyta cerastii-pumili 
 Ascochyta ceratocarpi 
 Ascochyta cerinthes 
 Ascochyta chaerophylli 
 Ascochyta charieidis 
 Ascochyta chartarum 
 Ascochyta charticola 
 Ascochyta cheiranthi 
 Ascochyta chelidonii 
 Ascochyta chelidoniicola 
 Ascochyta chenopodii 
 Ascochyta chenopodiicola 
 Ascochyta cherimoliae 
 Ascochyta chlianthi 
 Ascochyta chlorae 
 Ascochyta chlorospora 
 Ascochyta chochrjakovii 
 Ascochyta chrysanthemi 
 Ascochyta cicadina 
 Ascochyta cichorii 
 Ascochyta ciliolata 
 Ascochyta cinchonae 
 Ascochyta cinerariae 
 Ascochyta cinerea 
 Ascochyta cinnamomi 
 Ascochyta circaeae 
 Ascochyta cirsii 
 Ascochyta cissi 
 Ascochyta citri 
 Ascochyta citricola 
 Ascochyta citrullina 
 Ascochyta cladrastidis 
 Ascochyta clematidina 
 Ascochyta clianthi 
 Ascochyta cliviae 
 Ascochyta cocoes-australis 
 Ascochyta cocoes-capitatae 
 Ascochyta cocoina 
 Ascochyta codonopsidis 
 Ascochyta codonopsis 
 Ascochyta coffeae 
 Ascochyta colchica 
 Ascochyta colebrookeae 
 Ascochyta colocasiae-esculentae 
 Ascochyta colorata 
 Ascochyta columnaris 
 Ascochyta coluteae 
 Ascochyta coluteaecola 
 Ascochyta coluteicola 
 Ascochyta commiphorae 
 Ascochyta comocladiae 
 Ascochyta compositarum 
 Ascochyta compta 
 Ascochyta confusa 
 Ascochyta conicola 
 Ascochyta conorum 
 Ascochyta controversa 
 Ascochyta contubernalis 
 Ascochyta convolvuli 
 Ascochyta cookei 
 Ascochyta corchori 
 Ascochyta corchoricola 
 Ascochyta coreopsidis 
 Ascochyta cornicola 
 Ascochyta coronaria 
 Ascochyta coronariae 
 Ascochyta coronillae 
 Ascochyta corticola 
 Ascochyta coryli 
 Ascochyta cotyledonis 
 Ascochyta crambes 
 Ascochyta crambicola 
 Ascochyta crataegi 
 Ascochyta crataegicola 
 Ascochyta cretensis 
 Ascochyta cruris-galli 
 Ascochyta crus-galli 
 Ascochyta cryptostemmatis 
 Ascochyta crystallina 
 Ascochyta crytostemmatis 
 Ascochyta cucumeris 
 Ascochyta cucumis 
 Ascochyta culmicola 
 Ascochyta cuneomaculata 
 Ascochyta cyani 
 Ascochyta cyathulae 
 Ascochyta cycadicola 
 Ascochyta cycadina 
 Ascochyta cyclaminis 
 Ascochyta cymbopogonis 
 Ascochyta cynarae 
 Ascochyta cynodontis 
 Ascochyta cynosuricola 
 Ascochyta cyperi-ochracei 
 Ascochyta cypericola 
 Ascochyta cyperiphthora 
 Ascochyta cyphomandrae 
 Ascochyta cypripedii 
 Ascochyta cytisi

D

 Ascochyta dahliicola 
 Ascochyta daphnes 
 Ascochyta daturae 
 Ascochyta daturicola 
 Ascochyta davidiana 
 Ascochyta davidii 
 Ascochyta decipiens 
 Ascochyta deformis 
 Ascochyta delphinii 
 Ascochyta dendrostellerae 
 Ascochyta densiuscula 
 Ascochyta dentariae 
 Ascochyta desmazieri 
 Ascochyta destructiva 
 Ascochyta deutziae 
 Ascochyta dianthi 
 Ascochyta diapensiae 
 Ascochyta dicentrae 
 Ascochyta dichrocephalae 
 Ascochyta dictamni 
 Ascochyta diedickei 
 Ascochyta diervillae 
 Ascochyta difformis 
 Ascochyta digitalina 
 Ascochyta digitalis 
 Ascochyta digraphidis 
 Ascochyta dioscoreae 
 Ascochyta diplodina 
 Ascochyta diplodinoides 
 Ascochyta dipsaci 
 Ascochyta dolichi 
 Ascochyta dolomitica 
 Ascochyta donacina 
 Ascochyta doronici 
 Ascochyta dorycnii 
 Ascochyta drabae 
 Ascochyta dracaenicola 
 Ascochyta ducis-aprutii 
 Ascochyta ducometii 
 Ascochyta dulcamarae

E

 Ascochyta ebeleki 
 Ascochyta ebuli 
 Ascochyta echii 
 Ascochyta echinopis 
 Ascochyta effusa 
 Ascochyta elaeagni 
 Ascochyta elaterii 
 Ascochyta eleagni 
 Ascochyta elegans 
 Ascochyta elephas 
 Ascochyta ellipsospora 
 Ascochyta ellisii 
 Ascochyta elsholtziae 
 Ascochyta elymi 
 Ascochyta emeri 
 Ascochyta epilobii 
 Ascochyta equiseti 
 Ascochyta erevanica 
 Ascochyta eriobotryae 
 Ascochyta ervicola 
 Ascochyta erythrinae 
 Ascochyta erythronii 
 Ascochyta euonymella 
 Ascochyta euonymi 
 Ascochyta euonymicola 
 Ascochyta euphorbiae 
 Ascochyta euphrasiae 
 Ascochyta evonymi 
 Ascochyta exochordae 
 Ascochyta exochordi

F

 Ascochyta fabae 
 Ascochyta fagi 
 Ascochyta fagopyri 
 Ascochyta farfarae 
 Ascochyta ferdinandi 
 Ascochyta fernandi 
 Ascochyta ferrarisiana 
 Ascochyta ferulae 
 Ascochyta festucae-erectae 
 Ascochyta festucae 
 Ascochyta feuilleauboisiana 
 Ascochyta fibricola 
 Ascochyta fibriseda 
 Ascochyta ficus 
 Ascochyta foeniculina 
 Ascochyta foliicola 
 Ascochyta folliculorum 
 Ascochyta forsythiae 
 Ascochyta fragariae 
 Ascochyta fragariicola 
 Ascochyta fragosoi 
 Ascochyta frangulina 
 Ascochyta fraserae 
 Ascochyta frasericola 
 Ascochyta fraseriicola 
 Ascochyta fraxini 
 Ascochyta fraxinicola 
 Ascochyta fraxinifolia 
 Ascochyta fremontiae 
 Ascochyta fructigena 
 Ascochyta fumariae 
 Ascochyta funckiae 
 Ascochyta funkiae-sieboldianae 
 Ascochyta fuscescens 
 Ascochyta fuscopapillata

G

 Ascochyta gaillardiae 
 Ascochyta galatellae 
 Ascochyta galegae 
 Ascochyta galeopsidis 
 Ascochyta galii-aristati 
 Ascochyta galii 
 Ascochyta garciniae 
 Ascochyta gardeniae 
 Ascochyta garhwalensis 
 Ascochyta garrettiana 
 Ascochyta garryae 
 Ascochyta gaultheriae 
 Ascochyta gei 
 Ascochyta georgica 
 Ascochyta geranii 
 Ascochyta geraniicola 
 Ascochyta gerberae 
 Ascochyta githaginis 
 Ascochyta gladioli 
 Ascochyta glaucii 
 Ascochyta glechomae 
 Ascochyta glechomatis 
 Ascochyta glycyrrhizae 
 Ascochyta godetiae 
 Ascochyta goebeliae 
 Ascochyta gorakhpurensis 
 Ascochyta gorlenkoi 
 Ascochyta gossypii 
 Ascochyta gossypiicola 
 Ascochyta grabowskiae 
 Ascochyta gracilispora 
 Ascochyta graminea 
 Ascochyta graminicola subsp. graminicola 
 Ascochyta graminicola 
 Ascochyta graminum 
 Ascochyta grandimaculans 
 Ascochyta grandispora 
 Ascochyta greenei 
 Ascochyta grewiae 
 Ascochyta grossulariae 
 Ascochyta grovei 
 Ascochyta guaranitica

H

 Ascochyta halimodendri 
 Ascochyta haloxyli 
 Ascochyta hanseni 
 Ascochyta hansenii 
 Ascochyta haworthiae 
 Ascochyta helianthi 
 Ascochyta hellebori 
 Ascochyta helosciadii 
 Ascochyta hemipteleae 
 Ascochyta hepaticae 
 Ascochyta heraclei 
 Ascochyta herbicola 
 Ascochyta herreana 
 Ascochyta hesperidearum 
 Ascochyta hesperidis 
 Ascochyta heterodendri 
 Ascochyta heteromorpha 
 Ascochyta heterophragmia 
 Ascochyta heveae 
 Ascochyta heveana 
 Ascochyta hibisci-cannabini 
 Ascochyta hieracii 
 Ascochyta hieraciicola 
 Ascochyta hierochloae 
 Ascochyta himalayensis 
 Ascochyta hippocastani 
 Ascochyta hoatoaum 
 Ascochyta holci 
 Ascochyta homogynes 
 Ascochyta hordei 
 Ascochyta hordeicola 
 Ascochyta hortensis 
 Ascochyta hortorum 
 Ascochyta hoveniae 
 Ascochyta humuli 
 Ascochyta humuliphila 
 Ascochyta hupkei 
 Ascochyta hyacinthi 
 Ascochyta hyalospora 
 Ascochyta hydnocarpi 
 Ascochyta hydrangeae 
 Ascochyta hydrophylli-virginiana 
 Ascochyta hydrophylli 
 Ascochyta hyoscyami 
 Ascochyta hyoscyamicola 
 Ascochyta hyperici 
 Ascochyta hypochaeridis 
 Ascochyta hypochoeridis 
 Ascochyta hypophylla

I

 Ascochyta idaei 
 Ascochyta ignobilis 
 Ascochyta ilicia 
 Ascochyta ilicicola 
 Ascochyta ilicis 
 Ascochyta impatiens 
 Ascochyta impatientis 
 Ascochyta imperatae 
 Ascochyta imperfecta 
 Ascochyta indusiata 
 Ascochyta infortunata 
 Ascochyta infuscans 
 Ascochyta inulae 
 Ascochyta inulicola 
 Ascochyta iridis-pseudacori 
 Ascochyta iridis 
 Ascochyta irpina 
 Ascochyta irregularispora 
 Ascochyta ischaemi 
 Ascochyta italica 
 Ascochyta ixorae

J

 Ascochyta jaapi 
 Ascochyta jaapii 
 Ascochyta jaczevskii 
 Ascochyta jahniana 
 Ascochyta jasminicola 
 Ascochyta jenissensis 
 Ascochyta juelii 
 Ascochyta juglandis 
 Ascochyta julibrissin 
 Ascochyta junci

K

 Ascochyta kabati-bubaki 
 Ascochyta kabatiana 
 Ascochyta kalcevii 
 Ascochyta kalymbetovii 
 Ascochyta kashmeriana 
 Ascochyta kashmiriana 
 Ascochyta kazachstanica 
 Ascochyta kentiae 
 Ascochyta kerguelensis 
 Ascochyta kirulisii 
 Ascochyta kleinii 
 Ascochyta koelreuteriae 
 Ascochyta kuhniae 
 Ascochyta kurdistanica

L

 Ascochyta labiatarum 
 Ascochyta lablab 
 Ascochyta laburni 
 Ascochyta laconitiana 
 Ascochyta lactucae 
 Ascochyta lacustris 
 Ascochyta lagenaeformis 
 Ascochyta lageniformis 
 Ascochyta lagerstroemiae 
 Ascochyta lagochili 
 Ascochyta lallemantiae 
 Ascochyta lamiorum 
 Ascochyta lantanae 
 Ascochyta lappae 
 Ascochyta laricina 
 Ascochyta laskarisii 
 Ascochyta lathyri 
 Ascochyta lathyrina 
 Ascochyta latvica 
 Ascochyta laurina 
 Ascochyta laurocerasi 
 Ascochyta ledi 
 Ascochyta ledicola 
 Ascochyta leguminum 
 Ascochyta lentis 
 Ascochyta leonuri 
 Ascochyta leonuricola 
 Ascochyta lepidii 
 Ascochyta leptospora 
 Ascochyta lethalis 
 Ascochyta levistici 
 Ascochyta libanotidis 
 Ascochyta lichenoides 
 Ascochyta ligulariae 
 Ascochyta ligustri 
 Ascochyta ligustrina 
 Ascochyta limbalis 
 Ascochyta linariae 
 Ascochyta lini 
 Ascochyta linicola 
 Ascochyta liriodendri 
 Ascochyta lobeliae 
 Ascochyta lobikii 
 Ascochyta lolii 
 Ascochyta lomatii 
 Ascochyta londonensis 
 Ascochyta longan 
 Ascochyta lonicerae-canadensis 
 Ascochyta lophanthi 
 Ascochyta lorentzii 
 Ascochyta lucumae 
 Ascochyta ludwigiana 
 Ascochyta ludwigii 
 Ascochyta lunariae 
 Ascochyta lupini 
 Ascochyta lupinicola 
 Ascochyta luscopapillata 
 Ascochyta luzulae-divaricatae 
 Ascochyta luzulicola 
 Ascochyta lychnidis 
 Ascochyta lycii 
 Ascochyta lycopersici 
 Ascochyta lysimachiae

M

 Ascochyta maackiae 
 Ascochyta mabiana 
 Ascochyta macrospora 
 Ascochyta maculans 
 Ascochyta madisonensis 
 Ascochyta magnoliae 
 Ascochyta majalis 
 Ascochyta mali 
 Ascochyta malvacearum 
 Ascochyta malvae 
 Ascochyta malvarum 
 Ascochyta malvicola 
 Ascochyta manawaorae 
 Ascochyta mangiferae 
 Ascochyta manihotis 
 Ascochyta marantaceae 
 Ascochyta marchantiae 
 Ascochyta marginata 
 Ascochyta marssonia 
 Ascochyta martianoffiana 
 Ascochyta massaeana 
 Ascochyta matricariae 
 Ascochyta matritensis 
 Ascochyta matthiolae 
 Ascochyta maydis 
 Ascochyta medicaginicola var. macrospora 
 Ascochyta medicaginicola 
 Ascochyta medicaginis 
 Ascochyta melicae 
 Ascochyta meliloti 
 Ascochyta melissae 
 Ascochyta melongenae 
 Ascochyta melonis 
 Ascochyta menthicola 
 Ascochyta menyanthes 
 Ascochyta menyanthicola 
 Ascochyta menyanthis 
 Ascochyta menziesii 
 Ascochyta mercurialina 
 Ascochyta mercurialis 
 Ascochyta mespili 
 Ascochyta metulispora 
 Ascochyta microspora 
 Ascochyta millefolii 
 Ascochyta mimuli 
 Ascochyta minima 
 Ascochyta miniquadriguttulata 
 Ascochyta minor 
 Ascochyta minutissima 
 Ascochyta misera 
 Ascochyta missouriensis 
 Ascochyta miurae 
 Ascochyta miurai 
 Ascochyta miyakei 
 Ascochyta moellendorfii 
 Ascochyta moelleriana 
 Ascochyta moeszii 
 Ascochyta molleriana 
 Ascochyta monardae 
 Ascochyta montenegrina 
 Ascochyta moravica 
 Ascochyta mori 
 Ascochyta moricola 
 Ascochyta morifolia 
 Ascochyta mulgedii 
 Ascochyta murrayae 
 Ascochyta muscorum 
 Ascochyta mycoparasitica 
 Ascochyta myrticola 
 Ascochyta myrtilli

N

 Ascochyta nagrajii 
 Ascochyta natsume 
 Ascochyta nebulosa 
 Ascochyta necans 
 Ascochyta negundinis 
 Ascochyta nepalensis 
 Ascochyta nepetae 
 Ascochyta nepeticola 
 Ascochyta nicandrae 
 Ascochyta nicotianae 
 Ascochyta nigripycnidia 
 Ascochyta nigripycnidicola 
 Ascochyta nigripycnidiicola 
 Ascochyta nobilis 
 Ascochyta nyctanthis 
 Ascochyta nymphaeae

O

 Ascochyta obducens 
 Ascochyta obiones 
 Ascochyta oleae 
 Ascochyta oleandri 
 Ascochyta oleracea 
 Ascochyta oliviae 
 Ascochyta onobrychidis 
 Ascochyta ontariensis 
 Ascochyta opuli 
 Ascochyta opuntiae 
 Ascochyta orchidis 
 Ascochyta oreodaphnes 
 Ascochyta oreoselini 
 Ascochyta orientalis 
 Ascochyta orni 
 Ascochyta ornithopi 
 Ascochyta oro 
 Ascochyta orobanches 
 Ascochyta orobi 
 Ascochyta orobicola 
 Ascochyta oryzae 
 Ascochyta oryzina 
 Ascochyta osmaroniae 
 Ascochyta osmophila 
 Ascochyta osmundae 
 Ascochyta osmundicola 
 Ascochyta oudemansii 
 Ascochyta ovalispora 
 Ascochyta oxybaphi 
 Ascochyta oxycocci 
 Ascochyta oxyspora 
 Ascochyta oxytropidis 
 Ascochyta oxytropis

P

 Ascochyta pachyphragmae 
 Ascochyta padi 
 Ascochyta paeoniae 
 Ascochyta paliuri 
 Ascochyta pallida 
 Ascochyta pallor 
 Ascochyta palmicola 
 Ascochyta panacis 
 Ascochyta papaveris 
 Ascochyta papyricola 
 Ascochyta parasitica 
 Ascochyta parietariae 
 Ascochyta paspali 
 Ascochyta passeriniana 
 Ascochyta passiflorae 
 Ascochyta patagonica 
 Ascochyta patriniae 
 Ascochyta paucisporula 
 Ascochyta paulowniae 
 Ascochyta pedemontana 
 Ascochyta pedicularidis 
 Ascochyta pedicularis 
 Ascochyta pegani 
 Ascochyta pellucida 
 Ascochyta peperomiae 
 Ascochyta perforans 
 Ascochyta pergulariae 
 Ascochyta periclymeni 
 Ascochyta perillae 
 Ascochyta periplocae 
 Ascochyta petasitidis 
 Ascochyta petrakii 
 Ascochyta petroselini 
 Ascochyta petuniae 
 Ascochyta phacae 
 Ascochyta phaseolorum 
 Ascochyta phellodendri 
 Ascochyta philadelphi 
 Ascochyta philodendri 
 Ascochyta phleina 
 Ascochyta phlogina 
 Ascochyta phlogis 
 Ascochyta phlomidicola 
 Ascochyta phlomidis 
 Ascochyta phomoides 
 Ascochyta phyllachoroides 
 Ascochyta phyllidis 
 Ascochyta phyllostictoides 
 Ascochyta physalicola 
 Ascochyta physalidicola 
 Ascochyta physalina 
 Ascochyta phytolaccae 
 Ascochyta pilocarpi 
 Ascochyta piniperda 
 Ascochyta pinodella 
 Ascochyta pinodes 
 Ascochyta pinzolensis 
 Ascochyta piperina 
 Ascochyta piricola 
 Ascochyta pisarum 
 Ascochyta pisi 
 Ascochyta pisicola 
 Ascochyta plantaginella 
 Ascochyta plantaginicola 
 Ascochyta plantaginis 
 Ascochyta plumbaginicola 
 Ascochyta plumbaginis 
 Ascochyta plumeriae 
 Ascochyta poacearum 
 Ascochyta poae-badensis 
 Ascochyta poagena 
 Ascochyta podagrariae 
 Ascochyta polemonii 
 Ascochyta polygoni-setosi 
 Ascochyta polygoni 
 Ascochyta polygonicola 
 Ascochyta poonensis 
 Ascochyta populi 
 Ascochyta populicola 
 Ascochyta populina 
 Ascochyta populorum 
 Ascochyta portulacae 
 Ascochyta potentillarum 
 Ascochyta prasadii 
 Ascochyta premilcurensis 
 Ascochyta primulae 
 Ascochyta procenkoi 
 Ascochyta prosopidicola 
 Ascochyta pruni 
 Ascochyta prunicola 
 Ascochyta psammae 
 Ascochyta pseudacori 
 Ascochyta psoraleae 
 Ascochyta psorlareae 
 Ascochyta pteleae 
 Ascochyta pteridis 
 Ascochyta pterophila 
 Ascochyta pucciniophila 
 Ascochyta puiggarii 
 Ascochyta pulcherrima 
 Ascochyta pulmonariae 
 Ascochyta punctata 
 Ascochyta pyrethri 
 Ascochyta pyricola 
 Ascochyta pyrina

Q

 Ascochyta quadriguttulata 
 Ascochyta quercicola 
 Ascochyta quercus-ilicis 
 Ascochyta quercus 
 Ascochyta quercuum

R

 Ascochyta rabiei 
 Ascochyta rachidicola 
 Ascochyta rafiae 
 Ascochyta ramischiae 
 Ascochyta ranunculi 
 Ascochyta raphiae 
 Ascochyta raworthiae 
 Ascochyta resedae 
 Ascochyta reynoutriae 
 Ascochyta rhachidicola 
 Ascochyta rhagadioli 
 Ascochyta rhagodiae 
 Ascochyta rhamni 
 Ascochyta rheae 
 Ascochyta rhei 
 Ascochyta rheicola 
 Ascochyta rhodesii 
 Ascochyta rhododendri 
 Ascochyta rhodotypi 
 Ascochyta rhynchosiae 
 Ascochyta rhynchosporae 
 Ascochyta ribesia 
 Ascochyta ribicola 
 Ascochyta ribis 
 Ascochyta ricinella 
 Ascochyta ricini 
 Ascochyta ricinicola 
 Ascochyta robiniae 
 Ascochyta robinicola 
 Ascochyta roripae 
 Ascochyta rorippae 
 Ascochyta rosae 
 Ascochyta rosarum 
 Ascochyta rosicola 
 Ascochyta rosmarini 
 Ascochyta rostrupii 
 Ascochyta roystoneae 
 Ascochyta roystoneicola 
 Ascochyta rubi 
 Ascochyta rubiae 
 Ascochyta ruborum 
 Ascochyta rudbeckae 
 Ascochyta rudbeckiae 
 Ascochyta rufomaculans 
 Ascochyta rumicicola 
 Ascochyta rumicis-patientiae 
 Ascochyta rusticana

S

 Ascochyta saccardiana 
 Ascochyta saccardoana 
 Ascochyta saccardoi 
 Ascochyta sacchari 
 Ascochyta saccharophila 
 Ascochyta saginata 
 Ascochyta salicicola 
 Ascochyta salicifoliae 
 Ascochyta salicina 
 Ascochyta salicis 
 Ascochyta salicorniae-patulae 
 Ascochyta salicorniae 
 Ascochyta salsolae 
 Ascochyta sambucella 
 Ascochyta sambuci 
 Ascochyta saniculae 
 Ascochyta santali 
 Ascochyta santessonii 
 Ascochyta santolinae 
 Ascochyta saponariae 
 Ascochyta sarmenticia 
 Ascochyta sasae 
 Ascochyta savulescui 
 Ascochyta scabiosae 
 Ascochyta scandens 
 Ascochyta schelliana 
 Ascochyta sclareae 
 Ascochyta sclerochloae 
 Ascochyta scopoliae 
 Ascochyta scorzonerae 
 Ascochyta scotinospora 
 Ascochyta scrophulariae 
 Ascochyta scutellariae 
 Ascochyta securinegae 
 Ascochyta sedi-purpurei 
 Ascochyta sedi 
 Ascochyta selaginellae 
 Ascochyta semeles 
 Ascochyta sempervivi 
 Ascochyta senecionicola 
 Ascochyta senecionis 
 Ascochyta senensis 
 Ascochyta senneniana 
 Ascochyta septentrionalis 
 Ascochyta sesami 
 Ascochyta sesamicola 
 Ascochyta sesleriae 
 Ascochyta shoreana 
 Ascochyta sicyi 
 Ascochyta sidae 
 Ascochyta siemaszkoi 
 Ascochyta sii 
 Ascochyta silenes 
 Ascochyta siliquaecola 
 Ascochyta siliquastri 
 Ascochyta siliquicola 
 Ascochyta silphii 
 Ascochyta simillima 
 Ascochyta sinapis 
 Ascochyta siphonis 
 Ascochyta siraitia 
 Ascochyta siraitiae 
 Ascochyta sisymbrii 
 Ascochyta skagwayensis 
 Ascochyta skimmiae 
 Ascochyta smilacigena 
 Ascochyta smilacina 
 Ascochyta smilacis-canadensis 
 Ascochyta smilacis 
 Ascochyta socia 
 Ascochyta socialis 
 Ascochyta sodalis 
 Ascochyta sojae 
 Ascochyta sojicola 
 Ascochyta sojina 
 Ascochyta solani-nigri 
 Ascochyta solani-tuberosi 
 Ascochyta solani 
 Ascochyta solanicola 
 Ascochyta solidaginis 
 Ascochyta solidaginum 
 Ascochyta sonchi 
 Ascochyta sonchina 
 Ascochyta sophorae 
 Ascochyta sorbina 
 Ascochyta sorghi 
 Ascochyta sorghina 
 Ascochyta sorosii 
 Ascochyta sparganii-ramosi 
 Ascochyta sparganii 
 Ascochyta spartinae 
 Ascochyta sphaerophysae 
 Ascochyta sphaeropoda 
 Ascochyta spinaciae 
 Ascochyta spinaciicola 
 Ascochyta spiraeae 
 Ascochyta spireae 
 Ascochyta spondiacearum 
 Ascochyta sporoboli 
 Ascochyta spraguei 
 Ascochyta staphyleae 
 Ascochyta starcii 
 Ascochyta statices 
 Ascochyta staticicola 
 Ascochyta staticis 
 Ascochyta stellariae 
 Ascochyta sterculiae 
 Ascochyta sternbergensis 
 Ascochyta stilbocarpae 
 Ascochyta stipae-pennatae 
 Ascochyta stipae 
 Ascochyta stipata 
 Ascochyta stipina 
 Ascochyta straminea 
 Ascochyta strobilina 
 Ascochyta subalpina 
 Ascochyta suberosa 
 Ascochyta subgen. Ascochyta 
 Ascochyta subgen. Ascochytula 
 Ascochyta syconophila 
 Ascochyta symphoriae 
 Ascochyta symphoricarpi 
 Ascochyta symphoricarpophila 
 Ascochyta syringae 
 Ascochyta syringaecola 
 Ascochyta syringicola

T

 Ascochyta tamaricis 
 Ascochyta tami 
 Ascochyta taraxaci 
 Ascochyta tarda 
 Ascochyta tatarica 
 Ascochyta tayabensis 
 Ascochyta tecomae 
 Ascochyta tehonii 
 Ascochyta telekiae 
 Ascochyta telephii 
 Ascochyta tenerifensis 
 Ascochyta tenerrima 
 Ascochyta teretiuscula 
 Ascochyta teucrii 
 Ascochyta thalictri 
 Ascochyta thalictricola 
 Ascochyta thaspii 
 Ascochyta theae 
 Ascochyta thermopsidis 
 Ascochyta thlaspeos 
 Ascochyta tiliacorae 
 Ascochyta tiliae 
 Ascochyta tini 
 Ascochyta tirolensis 
 Ascochyta tobirae 
 Ascochyta tokyoensis 
 Ascochyta toluiferae 
 Ascochyta trachelospermi 
 Ascochyta trachycarpi 
 Ascochyta tragi 
 Ascochyta tragiae 
 Ascochyta tragopogonis 
 Ascochyta translucens 
 Ascochyta treleasei 
 Ascochyta tremulae 
 Ascochyta tribuli 
 Ascochyta trifolii-alpestris 
 Ascochyta trifolii 
 Ascochyta trifolli-alpestris 
 Ascochyta trigonellae 
 Ascochyta tripolitana 
 Ascochyta tritici 
 Ascochyta trollii 
 Ascochyta tropaeoli 
 Ascochyta tulipae 
 Ascochyta tussilaginis 
 Ascochyta tweediana 
 Ascochyta typhae-angustatae 
 Ascochyta typhoidearum

U

 Ascochyta ulicis-caledoniensis 
 Ascochyta ulicis 
 Ascochyta ulmella 
 Ascochyta ulmi 
 Ascochyta unedonis 
 Ascochyta uredinis 
 Ascochyta urenae 
 Ascochyta urticae 
 Ascochyta urticicola 
 Ascochyta usitatissima 
 Ascochyta utahensis

V

 Ascochyta vaccinii 
 Ascochyta valerandi 
 Ascochyta valerianae 
 Ascochyta valerianellae 
 Ascochyta vasjaginae 
 Ascochyta velata 
 Ascochyta ventricosa 
 Ascochyta veratri 
 Ascochyta veratrina 
 Ascochyta verbasci 
 Ascochyta verbascina 
 Ascochyta verbenae 
 Ascochyta veronicae 
 Ascochyta veronicicola 
 Ascochyta versabilis 
 Ascochyta versicolor 
 Ascochyta viburni 
 Ascochyta viburnicola 
 Ascochyta viciae-lathyroidis 
 Ascochyta viciae-pannonicae 
 Ascochyta viciae-pisiformis 
 Ascochyta viciae-villosae 
 Ascochyta viciae 
 Ascochyta vicicola 
 Ascochyta viciicola 
 Ascochyta vicina f. euonymella 
 Ascochyta vicina f. vicina 
 Ascochyta vicina var. euonymella 
 Ascochyta vicina var. foliicola 
 Ascochyta vicina 
 Ascochyta vignae 
 Ascochyta vincae 
 Ascochyta vindobonensis 
 Ascochyta violae-hirtae 
 Ascochyta violae 
 Ascochyta violicola 
 Ascochyta virgaureae 
 Ascochyta viscariae 
 Ascochyta vitalbae 
 Ascochyta vitalbicola 
 Ascochyta vitellinae 
 Ascochyta viticola 
 Ascochyta vivia 
 Ascochyta vodakii 
 Ascochyta volubilis 
 Ascochyta vulgaris 
 Ascochyta vulnerariae

W

 Ascochyta weigelae 
 Ascochyta weigeliae 
 Ascochyta weissiana 
 Ascochyta winteri 
 Ascochyta wisconsina 
 Ascochyta wistariae 
 Ascochyta wisteriae 
 Ascochyta woronowiana

X

 Ascochyta xanthiicola

Y

 Ascochyta yakushimensis 
 Ascochyta yuccaefolia 
 Ascochyta yuccaefoliae 
 Ascochyta yuccifolia

Z

 Ascochyta zanthoxyli 
 Ascochyta zavrelii-ignatii 
 Ascochyta zeae 
 Ascochyta zeicola 
 Ascochyta zeina 
 Ascochyta zimmermanni-hugonis 
 Ascochyta zimmermanni 
 Ascochyta zimmermannii 
 Ascochyta zingiberi 
 Ascochyta zingibericola 
 Ascochyta zingiberis 
 Ascochyta zinniae 
 Ascochyta zonata 
 Ascochyta zygophylli

References

 
Ascochyta